Saviour Pirotta is a Maltese-born British author and playwright who resides in England. He is mostly known for the bestselling The Orchard Book of First Greek Myths, an adaptation of the Russian folktale, Firebird,  and the Ancient Greek Mysteries Series for Bloomsbury. His books are particularly successful in the UK, Greece, Italy and South Korea.

Childhood 

The second of five brothers, Pirotta grew up speaking both English and Maltese. He attended Naxxar Primary School (now Maria Regina College) and later won a scholarship to St Aloysius' College, one of the most prestigious schools on the island. He developed a love of literature early on in life when he discovered the Narnia books by C.S. Lewis, Ian Serraillier's The Silver Sword and R.L. Stevenson's Treasure Island. The author's parents, both extremely devout Catholics, discouraged his general interest in the arts and censored most television programmes but Pirotta cites as visual influences on his writing the works of film animator Ray Harryhausen and Alexander Korda.

Career in the UK 
Pirotta emigrated to the UK in 1981 where his first job was directing three short plays for Moonshine Community Arts Workshop in London, an offshoot of Brian Way's pioneering Theatre Centre. He also wrote a children's play based on a Maltese folk tale which toured various venues around London, including the Oval House and Jacksons Lane Community Centre. This brought him to the attention of the Commonwealth Institute, where he worked as a workshop leader and storyteller till 1989.

The children's play was subsequently published by Samuel French and Pirotta has since concentrated on writing. His first efforts were picture books but he soon moved into non-fiction, specialising in pirates and religious festivals. His Pirates and Treasure, published in the UK, the US, Russia and Sweden in 1995 is widely considered to be the first children's book about sea-robbers with a multi-cultural viewpoint. For a while he also wrote science books for the very young using the pen name Sam Godwin. A Seed in Need – a first look at life cycle of a flower – won him the 1998 English Association Award for best non-fiction picture book.

Turtle Bay, published by Frances Lincoln in the UK and Farrar, Straus, Giroux in the United States, was selected by the National Science Teachers Association (NSTA) and assembled in co-operation with The Children's Book Council (CBC) as a Notable Science Trade Book of 1998. American Bookseller also chose it as one of their fall children's books 'pick of the list'. In the US, excerpts from his works are often used by homeschoolers and in schools for multiple choice tests.

In November 2010, his picture book Firebird was awarded an Aesop Accolade by the American Folklore Society. It shared the honour with Eric A. Kimmel's Joha Makes a Wish: A Middle Eastern Tale and Cloud Tea Monkeys by Mal Peet and Elspeth Graham. It also won a Best Book Award from the Oppenheim Toy Portfolio.

In November 2016, The Bookseller announced that Saviour Pirotta and his then agents Pollinger Ltd  had signed a contract with Bloomsbury Publishing for a series of middle grade adventure stories set in Ancient Greece. The series was titled Ancient Greek Mysteries. The first title, Mark of the Cyclops, published in March 2017 and the second, Secret of the Oracle followed in October. Two more titles appeared in 2018. These were called Pirates of Poseidon and Shadow of the Centaurs.

In 2018, Maverick Books announced a four book series by Pirotta set in the Neolithic period entitled Wolfsong. The first book, The Stolen Spear was published in August 2019.  In January 2019, Bloomsbury also published another adventure, this time set in the golden age of Islam called The Golden Horsemen of Baghdad.

The author is now a British citizen and lives in Scarborough, North Yorkshire.

Work in Translation

Pirotta's books have been translated and published by major commercial publishers in various countries, including the United States, Australia, Canada, Italy, France, Spain, Slovakia, Holland, Portugal, Germany, Rumania, Belgium, Sweden, Brazil, Thailand, Greece, Estonia, Poland, Russia, Lebanon, Japan, South Africa, Indonesia and South Korea. In 2020, Pirotta's literary agents signed a translation deal with Midsea Books in Malta to produce his Stone Age Wolfsong series, which is partly set on the island. The series is translated by Noel Tanti. In 2021, Midsea Books also published Pirotta's set of ten First Greek Myths.

Collaborations

Pirotta has collaborated with some of the biggest names in children's illustration today, including Jane Ray, Emma Chichester Clark, Catherine Hyde, Chris Riddell, Chris Mould, Jan Lewis, Alan Marks, Toni Goffe and Richard Johnson.

Theatre
In July 2019, the Stephen Joseph Theatre in Scarborough, North Yorkshire, announced that it is staging the world premiere of Pirotta's first professional play for children, Granny's Exploding Toilet, in the autumn.
The entire run was sold out. Pirotta was commissioned to write a second play, an adaptation of Little Red Riding Hood for the SJT. It was scheduled for April 2020 but the production was put back to 2021 and then 2022 due to the Coronavirus Panademic.

Festival appearances

Pirotta has appeared at the Edinburgh Children's Book Festival, the Bradford Literary Festival, the Northern Children's Book Festival, the Swansea Book Festival, the Scarborough Literary Festival, the Linton Book Festival, the Liverpool Children's Festival of Reading  and the Beverley LitUp Festival.

Awards and honours
 The Heart Scarab was longlisted for the Sparkle Book Awards, 2022 - 2023 
 Pandora's Box won the Fiction Express Readers Award for Best Fiction, 2020.
 The Golden Horsemen of Baghdad was shortlisted for the North Somerset Teachers' Book Award for Quality Fiction, 2019.
 The Unicorn Prince was included in The Guardian's Books of the Month in October 2018.
 Mark of the Cyclops was shortlisted for the Historical Association Young Quills Award, 2018.
 Mark of the Cyclops won the North Somerset Teachers' Book Award for Quality Fiction, 2018.
 Firebird won an Aesop Accolade in the US, 2010.
 Firebird won the Oppenheim Toy Portfolio Gold Award, 2010.
 The Orchard Book of First Greek Myths was included in the Ultimate Young Book Guide, 2002.

Selected works 

FICTION
 Earth Shaker, Fiction Express 2022
 The Heart Scarab (Book 1 of The Nile Adventures), Maverick 2022
 The Search for the Copper Scroll, Fiction Express 2022
 Tears of the Sun God, Fiction Express 2021
 The Stolen Spear (Book 1 of the Wolfsong Series), Maverick 2019
 The Whispering Stones (Book 2 of the Wolfsong Series), Maverick 2020
 The Mysterious Island (Book 3 of the Wolfsong Series), Maverick 2021
 The Wolf's Song (Book 4 of the Wolfsong Series), Maverick 2022
 The Golden Horsemen of Baghdad, Bloomsbury 2019
 The River Queen, Fiction Express 2018 
 The River King, Fiction Express 2018
 The River Prince, Fiction Express 2019
 Pandora's Box, Fiction Express 2020
 Mark of the Cyclops - An Ancient Greek Mystery, Bloomsbury 2017 
 Secret of the Oracle - An Ancient Greek Mystery, Bloomsbury 2017
 Pirates of Poseidon - An Ancient Greek Mystery, Bloomsbury 2018
 Shadow of the Centaurs - An Ancient Greek Mystery, Bloomsbury 2018
 The Warrior Princess, Fiction Express 2017
 My Cousin the Minotaur, Fiction Express 2016 
 Shadowcave, Fiction Express 2017

ANTHOLOGIES

 Storyworld [illustrated by Fiona Small], Blackie & Sons, 1988 [re-issued as Tales From Around the World in 1994]
 Joy to the World:  Christmas Stories from around the Globe [illustrated by Sheila Moxley], Frances Lincoln/Harpercollins, 1998
 The Sleeping Princess and other Fairy Tales from Grimm [illustrated by Emma Chichester Clark], Orchard Books 2002 [titled The MacElderry Book of Grimm's Fairy Tales in the US]
 The Orchard Book of First Greek Myths [illustrated by Jan Lewis], Orchard Books, 2003
 Once upon a World [illustrated by Alan Marks], Watts/Sea to Sea Publications, 2004
 Aesop's Fables [illustrated by Richard Johnson], Kingfisher 2005
 Traditional Stories from the Amazon [illustrated by Rebecca Gryspeerdt], Hodder Children's Books 2006
 Around the World in 80 Tales [illustrated by Richard Johnson], Kingfisher 2007
 Children's Stories from the Bible [illustrated by Ian Andrew and Anne Yvonne Gilbert], Templar 2008
 The Giant Book of Giants, Egmont Books, October 2011
 The Orchard Book of Grimm's Fairytales,[illustrated by Emma Chichester Clark] Orchard Books, November 2011
 The Buccaneering Book of Pirates, Frances Lincoln, October 2013
 Greek Myths, [US only], Sterling Publishing, April 2015
 The Orchard Book of Grimm's Fairy Tales - Deluxe edition, Orchard Books, 2015 [3 September 2015]
 The Ghosts Who Danced, Frances Lincoln, [3 September 2015]
 Orchard Ballet Stories for Young Children [illustrated by Brigette Barrager], Orchard Books, 2016.

SERIES

 First Greek Myths, ten books [illustrated by Jan Lewis], Orchard Books, March 2008/2010
 Grimm's Fairy Tales, eight books [illustrated by Cecilia Johansson], Orchard Books, March 2012/ paperback January 2013
 Classic Stories, nine books [illustrated by Sara Gianassi, Marcin Piwowarski, Alida Massari, Alessandra Fusi, Robert Dunn, and John Manders], Starry Forest Books, January 2021
 Baby's First, six books [illustrated by Amanda Enright and Megan Higgins], Starry Forest Books, March 2022

PICTURE BOOKS

 Solomon's Secret [illustrated by Helen Cooper], Methuen/Dial 1989
 Do You Believe in Magic? 1990
 Little Bird [illustrated by Steve Butler], Frances Lincoln/Tambourine 1992
 Turtle Bay [illustrated by Nilesh Mistry], Frances Lincoln/Farrar Straus Giroux, 1998 [re-issued as Turtle Watch, 2008]
 Patrick Paints a Picture [illustrated by Linz West], Frances Lincoln 2008
 Firebird [illustrated by Catherine Hyde], Templar September 2010/paperback, 2014
 George and the Dragon, [illustrated by Martina Peluso], harpercollins 2015
 The Talking Bird, [illustrated by Louise Pigott], harpercollins, 2017
 The Unicorn Prince [illustrated by Jane Ray] Orchard Books 2018

References

External links 
 

British children's writers
Living people
1958 births
English children's writers
21st-century English novelists
English non-fiction writers
People from Scarborough, North Yorkshire
Maltese male novelists
People from Naxxar
English male novelists
21st-century English male writers
English male non-fiction writers
Maltese dramatists and playwrights
Maltese children's writers
21st-century Maltese novelists
English-language writers from Malta